The 2002 Ford 400 was an NASCAR Winston Cup Series race held on November 17, 2002, at Homestead Miami Speedway in Homestead, Florida. Contested over 267 laps on the 1.5 mile (2.4 km) speedway, it was the 36th and final race of the 2002 NASCAR Winston Cup Series season. Kurt Busch of Roush Racing won the race and Tony Stewart of Joe Gibbs Racing won the championship.

Summary
Starting in 2002 season, the final race was held at Homestead Miami Speedway. In the final race on the old configuration, Kurt Busch drove to his 4th win in a rain-delayed event, and Tony Stewart would win his 1st career championship.

Top 10 results

References

Ford 400
Ford 400
NASCAR races at Homestead-Miami Speedway